Charles-Louis Balzac (1752 – 1820) was a French architect and architectural draughtsman.

Life
Balzac was born in Paris in 1752. He made many drawings for Denon's work on the monuments of Egypt, and also views of various interesting Egyptian buildings, such as the interior of the Mosque at Hassan, the Palace of Karnac, the Great Sphinx, and the Pyramids of Ghizeh. He died in Paris in 1820.

References

Sources
 

French draughtsmen
18th-century French architects
19th-century French architects
Commission des Sciences et des Arts members
1752 births
1820 deaths
Artists from Paris